St. Croix Central High School may refer to:

St. Croix Central High School (Virgin Islands)
St. Croix Central High School (Colorado)
St. Croix Central High School (Wisconsin)